Kevin Taylor (born November 4, 1982 in Miami, Florida) is an American soccer player who most recently played for AFC Ann Arbor in the National Premier Soccer League.

Career

College and Amateur
Taylor grew up in Miami, Florida, where he was a 1997 and 1998 All State and 2000 second team All American soccer player at Gulliver Preparatory School. He played college soccer at the University of Michigan from 2000 to 2003., and spent the 2003 collegiate off-season with the Michigan Bucks of the USL Premier Development League.

Taylor was drafted in the third round (25th fifth overall) of the 2004 MLS SuperDraft by the Colorado Rapids, but he was not offered a contract by the team, and he returned to play for Bucks for the 2004 and 2005 PDL seasons. In 2005, he was named the PDL Defender of the Year.

Professional
Following the Bucks’ elimination from the 2005 PDL playoffs, Taylor signed with the Rochester Rhinos of the USL First Division.  He played one game with the Rhinos in 2004 and then three games in 2005.  On March 30, 2007, he signed a one year contract with an option for a second year with the Minnesota Thunder of the USL First Division.

After being released by the Thunder in February 2009, Taylor re-signed with the Michigan Bucks.

In 2013, Taylor signed with Detroit City, and scored on a penalty kick in his second game.

References

External links
 USL Player Profile
 Minnesota Thunder Player Profile

1983 births
Living people
American soccer players
Michigan Wolverines men's soccer players
Flint City Bucks players
Rochester New York FC players
Minnesota Thunder players
USL First Division players
USL League Two players
National Premier Soccer League players
AFC Ann Arbor players
Soccer players from Florida
Colorado Rapids draft picks
Association football defenders